Ben Kerner (November 18, 1913 – November 22, 2000) was an American professional basketball owner. He was the co-founder and owner of the St. Louis Hawks of the National Basketball Association, the present-day Atlanta Hawks. In 1946, Kerner co–founded with Leo Ferris a professional team in Buffalo, New York. The team then moved to become the Tri-Cities Blackhawks after a few games. Kerner moved the franchise from Moline, Illinois to Milwaukee in 1951 and to St. Louis in 1955. His 1958 St. Louis Hawks won the NBA Championship.

Notable transactions

In 1946, along with business partner Leo Ferris, Kerner founded a professional team in Buffalo, New York. After a few games in Buffalo, the franchise relocated to Moline, Illinois, where the team began play as the Tri-Cities Blackhawks. Kerner served as both owner and general manager.

During the 1946–47 season, Ferris and Kerner added Pop Gates to the Buffalo/Tri-Cities team. Gates finished second on the team in scoring, behind 1948 NBL MVP Don Otten. A Naismith Memorial Basketball Hall of Fame player, Gates was a factor in integrating the league and the first African–American coach in a major league when he coached the 1948 Dayton Rens.

In 1949, Kerner hired eventual Naismith Hall of Fame coach Red Auerbach as coach of the Tri-Cities Blackhawks. The 1949–50 Blackhawks were 28–29 when Auerbach quit after discovering Kerner had traded a player without consulting him. Auerbach became coach the Boston Celtics for the 1950–51 season and won nine NBA championships with the Celtics, facing off with Kerner owned teams in the NBA Finals on multiple occasions.

In the 1950 NBA Draft, Kerner drafted Naismith Hall of Fame player Bob Cousy with the fourth overall selection. Kerner eventually traded Cousy to the Chicago Stags without playing a fame for the Tri-Cities. Cousy, reportedly unhappy to go to a small-town area, wanted $10,000 to sign with the Blackhawks. Kerner countered with $6,000 before trading him to the Stags on May 21, 1950 for Frankie Brian. Cousy never played for Chicago and landed in Boston, playing for Auerbach after the Stags folded. Cousy played in 13 consecutive All-Star games and won six NBA Championships with the Celtics.

After the 1950-51 season, Kerner moved the Tri-Cities Blackhawks to Milwaukee, Wisconsin where they became the Milwaukee Hawks and moving from Wharton Field House to the larger Milwaukee Arena.

Kerner drafted Hall of Fame player Bob Pettit in the first round (number two) of the 1954 NBA Draft and Pettit became the cornerstone of the franchise. Pettit, who averaged 26 points and 16 rebounds per game over his career, was voted the NBA Most Valuable Player in both 1956 and 1959. At , Pettit was a ten–time First–Team All-NBA member and retired as the all-time leading NBA scorer. His 16.2 per-game rebound average is third in league history, behind Bill Russell and Wilt Chamberlain.

In 1956, Kerner drafted Hall of Fame player Bill Russell as the second pick in the first round of the 1956 NBA Draft. Kerner then traded Russell to the Boston Celtics for Cliff Hagan and former St. Louis University star Ed Macauley, both Hall of Fame players. Russell eventually replaced Auerbach as coach of the Celtics, winning two titles as player-coach.

From 1953–54 to 1956–57, the Hawks were coached by Hall of Fame coach Red Holzman. Holzman was replaced in 1956–57 by Hall of Fame coach Alex Hannum. Holzman later won two NBA championships with the New York Knicks. Hannum led the Hawks to the NBA championship before being fired immediately after the championship season.

In the 1960 NBA Draft, Kerner and the Hawks drafted Hall of Fame player and coach Lenny Wilkens as the sixth pick of the first round. After retiring as a player, Wilkens coached for 32 NBA seasons and won over 1,300 games.

Hawks-Celtics rivalry
Kerner had a number of ties to the Boston Celtics; he had employed Celtics coach Red Auerbach, drafted Bob Cousy and Bill Russell and obtained former Celtics Cliff Hagan and Ed Macauley. By the late 1950s, the teams had met three times in the NBA finals; Kerner's Hawks were built around four Hall of Fame players: Hagan, Macauley, Slater Martin and Bob Pettit.

The 1957 NBA Finals went to seven games as the Hawks lost to the Celtics' Auerbach, Russell and Cousy. During the finals, Auerbach and Kerner confronted each other on the court in a dispute over the height of the basket and Auerbach punched Kerner. Although he was not ejected, Auerbach was later fined $300 for the incident.

1958 NBA championship
The 1957–58 season saw Kerner and the St. Louis Hawks win the NBA Championship, as the Hawks and Celtics met in the Finals for the second consecutive year. This time the Hawks won, defeating the Celtics four games to two. Pettit scored 50 points in the deciding game, tipping in the final basket for a 110–109 victory in St. Louis.

The Celtics, still coached by Auerbach, and the Hawks (coached by Ed Macauley) met for a third time in the 1960 NBA Finals. The finals went seven games, with the Celtics winning game seven 122-103 at the Boston Garden. Pettit averaged 25 points per game during the series.

Sale and move to Atlanta
After the 1967-68 season, Kerner sold the St. Louis Hawks to Thomas Cousins and former Georgia governor Carl Sanders. The new owners moved the team to Atlanta, where they remain today, as the Atlanta Hawks.

Venues
Under Kerner's ownership, the Tri-Cities Blackhawks played at Wharton Field House in Moline, Illinois. The facility is still in use today and is located at 1800 20th Avenue, Moline.

The Milwaukee Hawks played at Milwaukee Arena. Today, the arena is used by the UW-Milwaukee Panthers and has been renamed the UW–Milwaukee Panther Arena. The address is 400 West Kilbourn Avenue, Milwaukee.

The St. Louis Hawks played at Kiel Auditorium, and occasionally at the larger St. Louis Arena. The Kiel (1401 Clark Avenue) was demolished in 1992 and the St. Louis Arena (5700 Oakland Avenue) was demolished in 1998.

Cultural influence
A book about the St. Louis Hawks by Greg Marecek, Full Court: The Untold Stories of the St. Louis Hawks, was published in 2006.

Awards and personal life
Ben Kerner was born to Jacob and Helen Arbesman Kerner on November 18, 1913 in Poland. Kerner died on November 22, 2000, and is buried in Mt. Sinai Cemetery in Affton, Missouri. He had one sister, Sylvia Kerner Robinson. Kerner was married to Ima Jean Bilbrey on November 24, 1972 in Las Vegas, Nevada. He and his wife, had two sons: Ben Jr. and Kyle.

Ben Kerner was inducted into the Missouri Sports Hall of Fame in 1992.

In 2015, Kerner was inducted into the St. Louis Sports Hall of Fame.

References

1913 births
2000 deaths
Atlanta Hawks owners
National Basketball Association executives
National Basketball League (United States) owners
Businesspeople from St. Louis
Tri-Cities Blackhawks